Ray or Raymond Collins may refer to:

Ray Collins (baseball) (1887–1970), American pitcher in Major League Baseball
Ray Collins (actor) (1889–1965), American actor
Raymond J. Collins (1897–1965), New Zealand philatelist 
Ray Collins (American football) (1927–1991), American football defensive tackle
Ray Collins (cartoonist), American cartoonist
Raymond Collins (priest) (born 1935), American Roman Catholic priest and theologian
Ray Collins (musician) (1936–2012), American singer
Ray Collins, Baron Collins of Highbury (born 1954), British trade unionist and politician
Raymond Collins, character in Ravenswood

See also
Raymond Collings (1908–1973), British bobsledder